The Eastern Virginia Rivers National Wildlife Refuge Complex is a complex of four National Wildlife Refuges in Virginia whose management is overseen by the United States Fish and Wildlife Service.  The four refuges are:

James River National Wildlife Refuge
Presquile National Wildlife Refuge
Plum Tree Island National Wildlife Refuge
Rappahannock River Valley National Wildlife Refuge

References
Complex website

National Wildlife Refuges in Virginia